The Miscarriages of Justice Organisation (MOJO) is a Scottish charity dedicated to human rights and to changing the criminal justice system in order to reduce the number of miscarriages of criminal justice and increase the level of professional after-care for victims.

After his conviction was overturned and his incarceration ended, Patrick Hill, one of the so-called Birmingham Six, set out to assist people who claim to have been wrongfully convicted. The Miscarriages of Justice Organisation is a voluntary sector non profit making organisation and a registered charity.

External links
 MOJO official site

Legal advocacy organizations